Janzi Band, sometimes simply Janzi, is a Ugandan afro-fusion, contemporary and world music group formed on 27 August 2009 by Ssewa Ssewa and friends Abraham Sekasi, Jackson Kirya and Steven Oundo. The band has a hybrid repertoire of music, including notable covers as well as an original ethno-pop discography. The band has worked alongside a number of Ugandan musicians, including Lilian Mbabazi and A Pass.

They are known for the creation of a new Ugandan harp-like instrument, the Janzi.

Their first album, Eka (Home) was released in on i-Tunes in 2017.

Background
Janzi is a Luganda word that means grasshopper, which according to the founders Ssewa Ssewa and friends Abraham Sekasi, Jackson Kirya and Steven Oundo, means that Janzi Band flies like grasshoppers. In 2009, Ssewa Ssewa and Abraham developed an idea to start a project that could aid cultural development through music. Their ambition was to unite cultures of different regions in the world through combining music of different ethnic origins.

Career
Since its inception in 2009, Janzi Band has steadily grown and has performed at different gigs in Uganda such as Zone 7 in Bugolobi, Club Amnesia, Big Mikes at Acacia Avenue and several casual and corporate functions. They have also performed at the annual Blankets and Wine festival, Milege World Music Festival in 2013 and 2015, Pearl Rhythm Festival, Bayimba Festival and others.

In 2016, they headlined the Tokosa Food Festival with Ugandan musician Lilian Mbabazi, and in the same year collaborated with A Pass at the Chronixx Show.

, their music is described on their Facebook page as "all-acoustic, all-traditional ensemble" as well as "an electric Afro-beat fusion band for festivals, weddings and concerts". They like the music of Afrigo Band, Morgan Heritage, UB40 and Salif Keita.

Band members

Current members
 the band has nine members:
Ssewa Ssewa (founder, African traditional instrumentalist, vocalist, percussionist)
 Abraham Ssekasi (traditional instruments, vocalist and percussionist)
 Trevor Muhumuza (music director, keyboard and vocals)
 Kevin Sekasi (drums and vocals)
 Jimmy Lubwama (lead vocals and guitar
 Allan Okia (bass guitarist and music producer),
 Joseph Kizito (saxophonist)
 Hakim Kiwanuka (percussionist and African instrumentalist)
 Michael Ssebulime (lead guitarist)

Past members

Discography

Albums

Eka (2017)
Eka is Janzi's first studio album and was officially released on iTunes on 7 May 2017. All the songs on the album were co-written and co-produced by the band's members. The songs on the album have however been played live by the band for many years. Eka was released under the band's label, Janzi Music.

See also
List of Ugandan musicians

References

External links

World music groups
Ugandan musical groups
Musical groups established in 2009
Musical quintets
Indie folk groups